Robert Duncan is a Canadian composer of film and television music.  He has composed music for such TV series as Buffy the Vampire Slayer and Castle; as well as films such as Butterfly on a Wheel and Into the Blue 2: The Reef. He has been associated with writer/producer Shawn Ryan, composing some of his produced TV shows including The Unit, Lie to Me, Timeless and more recently S.W.A.T..  He has received fourteen ASCAP  awards. Early life 

Born and raised in Toronto, Ontario, Canada, Duncan was born into a family with deep musical history. His great-grandfather arranged music for silent films in England and other relatives were closely affiliated with two of England's prominent composers, Ralph Vaughan Williams and Benjamin Britten.  As a child he attended the Claude Watson School of the Performing Arts and in sixth grade he composed his first piece of music. At age 16 in high school, he landed his first gig scoring a promotional video for the local Board of Education. As an extra curricular activity, Duncan studied the pipe organ and trumpet before later earning a bachelor's degree in music at York University.

 Career 

After graduating, Duncan spent the next 5 years apprenticing with two Canadian composers and participated in the ASCAP Film Scoring Workshop. He wanted to do more, wanted to write scores for live orchestra but he thought the chances of succeeding in Canada were slim so in 2001 he moved to Los Angeles, Hollywood. Shortly after moving to Los Angeles, Duncan was hired as a series composer on Buffy the Vampire Slayer. The show later ended, but soon after he started to land his own television and film scoring assignments. Landing many small screen projects including "The Chicago Code", "Terriers", "The Gates", "Lie to Me", "The Unit", Point Pleasant, "Tru Calling" and S.W.A.T.'', it is his work on "Castle" that he is best known for.

Instruments 

Duncan uses a variety of traditional and peculiar objects and instruments to create his scores. These objects include; grand pianos, deconstructed pianos, metal brushes, hot rod exhaust pipes, fire extinguishers, trumpet, guitar, pipe organ, a variety of drums, and even objects from junk yards all over Los Angeles.

Cameos 

Duncan made on screen appearances on "Castle" Season 4, Episode 14 “The Blue Butterfly” in the opening scene as a jazz club pianist on the baby grand piano as well as Season 8, Episode 8 "Mr. and Mrs. Castle" as a cruise ship pianist.

Scores

Television series

Film

References

External links
 
 

American film score composers
American male film score composers
American television composers
Living people
Buffy the Vampire Slayer
Musicians from Toronto
Year of birth missing (living people)